The 2009 College Nationals was the 14th Men's and Women's College Nationals.  The College Nationals was a team handball tournament to determined the College National Champion from 2009 from the US.

Final ranking

Men's ranking

Source:

Women's ranking

Source:

References

USA Team Handball College Nationals by year